is a Japanese singer-songwriter. He is currently working with "Chikyukyoudai" ("World Siblings"). His notable works include Sakura and the album Hibi Sansan.

Singles

References

External links 
 

1974 births
Living people
Japanese male pop singers
Japanese male singer-songwriters
Warner Music Japan artists
Musicians from Tochigi Prefecture
20th-century Japanese male singers
20th-century Japanese singers
21st-century Japanese male singers
21st-century Japanese singers